Gussjön is a lake in Sala Municipality, Sweden. It is situated close to Salbohed. The lake is a Natura 2000 area.

References

Lakes of Västmanland County